The Saint-Ouen Cemetery is located just north of Montmartre at Saint-Ouen, near Paris. The cemetery consists of two parts. The first, located on Rue Adrien Lesesne opened in 1860 and the second at 2 Avenue Michelet was opened on 1 September 1872.

Notable burials 
 Alphonse Allais (1854–1905), writer
 Yvette Andréyor (1891–1962), actress
 Mireille Balin (1909–1968), film actress
 Roland Charmy (1908–1987), violinist, husband of harpist Lily Laskine
 Carmen Damedoz, née Marie Élise Provost (1819-1964), artists model, dancer and aviator
 Eugène Godard (1827–1890), aeronaut
 Lily Laskine (1893–1988), harpist
 Mona Goya (1909–1961), actress
 Suzanne Lenglen (1899–1938), tennis champion
 Alfred Manessier (1911–1993), painter
 Jules Pascin (1885–1930), artist (later re-interred)
 Henri Quittard (1864–1919), composer, musicologist
 Émile-Alexandre Taskin, (1853–1897), opera singer
 Suzanne Valadon (1865–1938), painter

The cemetery contains one British Commonwealth war grave, of a Royal Marines officer of World War I.

References

External links
 

1860 establishments in France
Saint-Ouen
Roman Catholic cemeteries in France
Buildings and structures in Seine-Saint-Denis
Tourist attractions in Seine-Saint-Denis